Robert Woge (born 14 May 1984) is a retired German professional boxer. He is a former IBF Inter-Continental Light Heavyweight champion.

Professional career
Woge won the vacant IBF Inter-Continental Light Heavyweight title on February 2, 2013 by defeating Hakim Zoulikha by eleventh-round technical knockout.

He would lose the title to Anatoliy Dudchenko on October 26, 2013 via twelfth-round unanimous decision.

Professional boxing record 

|-
|align="center" colspan=8|12 Wins (10 knockouts), 1 Loss, 0 Draws
|-
| align="center" style="border-style: none none solid solid; background: #e3e3e3"|Res.
| align="center" style="border-style: none none solid solid; background: #e3e3e3"|Record
| align="center" style="border-style: none none solid solid; background: #e3e3e3"|Opponent
| align="center" style="border-style: none none solid solid; background: #e3e3e3"|Type
| align="center" style="border-style: none none solid solid; background: #e3e3e3"|Round
| align="center" style="border-style: none none solid solid; background: #e3e3e3"|Date
| align="center" style="border-style: none none solid solid; background: #e3e3e3"|Location
| align="center" style="border-style: none none solid solid; background: #e3e3e3"|Notes
|- align=center
|Loss
|align=center|12–1||align=left| Anatoliy Dudchenko
|
|
|
|align=left|
|align=left|
|- align=center
|Win
|align=center|12–0||align=left| Dariusz Sęk
|
|
|
|align=left|
|align=left|
|- align=center
|Win
|align=center|11–0||align=left| Hakim Zoulikha
|
|
|
|align=left|
|align=left|
|- align=center
|Win
|align=center|10–0||align=left| Serhiy Demchenko
|
|
|
|align=left|
|align=left|
|- align=center
|Win
|align=center|9–0||align=left| Ferenc Hafner
|
|
|
|align=left|
|align=left|
|- align=center
|Win
|align=center|8–0||align=left| Carl Dilks
|
|
|
|align=left|
|align=left|
|- align=center
|Win
|align=center|7–0||align=left| Roberto Cocco
|
|
|
|align=left|
|align=left|
|- align=center
|Win
|align=center|6–0||align=left| John Waldron
|
|
|
|align=left|
|align=left|
|- align=center
|Win
|align=center|5–0||align=left| Sam Couzens
|
|
|
|align=left|
|align=left|
|- align=center
|Win
|align=center|4–0||align=left| Orial Kolaj
|
|
|
|align=left|
|align=left|
|- align=center
|Win
|align=center|3–0||align=left| Miroslav Kvocka
|
|
|
|align=left|
|align=left|
|- align=center
|Win
|align=center|2–0||align=left| Armen Azizian
|
|
|
|align=left|
|align=left|
|- align=center
|Win
|align=center|1–0|| align=left| Valerijs Gubins
|
|
|
|align=left|
|align=left|

References

External links 
  

1984 births
Living people
People from Bernburg
German male boxers
Light-heavyweight boxers
Sportspeople from Saxony-Anhalt